Godina is the surname of the following people
Ferdo Godina (1912–1994), Slovene writer and partisan
John Godina (born 1972), American shot putter
Karpo Godina (born 1943), Slovenian cinematographer and film director
Lucio and Simplicio Godina (1908–1936), conjoined twins from the Philippines
 Marco Godina (born 1962), Italian mathematician
Marko Godina (1943–1986), Slovenian plastic surgeon
Mátyás Godina (1768–1835), Slovene Lutheran pastor, writer and teacher
Tanja Godina (born 1970), Slovenian swimmer 
Yelena Godina (born 1977), Russian volleyball player
Michael F. Godina (born 1986), American (U.S Marine)

See also
Godin (surname)